Duarte Benavente (born 4 March 1971 in Lisbon, Portugal) is a Portuguese powerboat racer and the 2020 UIM F2 World Champion. 

Benavente races for F1 Team Atlantic and competes in both the F1 Powerboat World Championship (F1H2O) and the UIM F2 World Championship.

References

1971 births
Living people
Formula 1 Powerboat drivers
Portuguese motorsport people
People from Lisbon